Ivan Sergeyevich Tregubov (January 19, 1930 – September 1, 1992) was a Soviet ice hockey defenceman in the 1950s and 1960s.

He was born in the Mordovian ASSR of the Russian SFSR, Soviet Union.

Tregubov played for HC CSKA Moscow from 1951–62, SKA Kuibyshev from 1962–64, and Khimik Voskresensk in 1964-65.  He was named to the Soviet all-star team four consecutive years beginning in 1955.  He was inducted into the USSR Hall of Fame in 1956.

Tregubov played 100 games for the national team.  He played in six IIHF World Championships, being named the best defenceman in 1958 and 1961.  He won the 1956 Olympic and World Championship gold in 1956, as well as World Championship silver four times and bronze once.

Sources
IIHF Directorate awards
CCCP International

1930 births
1992 deaths
HC CSKA Moscow players
HC Khimik Voskresensk players
Ice hockey players at the 1956 Winter Olympics
Medalists at the 1956 Winter Olympics
Olympic gold medalists for the Soviet Union
Olympic ice hockey players of the Soviet Union
Olympic medalists in ice hockey
Soviet ice hockey defencemen